Mirth Connect is a cross-platform interface engine used in the healthcare industry that enables the management of information using bi-directional sending of many types of messages. The primary use of this interface engine is in healthcare.

On September 9, 2013 Mirth Corporation announced they were acquired by Quality Systems.

Adopters
The Certification Commission for Healthcare Information Technology (CCHIT), in a push to ensure interoperability standards between electronic health records, has adopted Laika, an open source standards software program. At the 2009 Annual HIMSS Conference, Mirth was selected as one of the testing tools for the coming interoperability tests.

References

Free health care software
Free software testing tools
Health standards
Health care software